The .IE is the domain name registry for the .ie country code top-level domain. Their work includes protecting, supporting and promoting the web presence of all .ie domain names. They administer and manage the .ie namespace in the public interest.  

Founded in 1991, they spun out of UCD and became a private company in July 2000. While still operating as an independent private company, they liaise with government departments, governing bodies, trade associations as required and abide by internet best practice principles. They have no shareholders and are owned by the directors. Being limited by guarantee is a common structure for global domain registries. Surpluses are added to opening reserves. Directors don’t have a beneficial interest in the reserves of the company.

They operate on a not-for-profit basis and are a member of the Council of European National Top-Level Domain Registries (CENTR).

The IE Domain Registry operates a managed registry model for Ireland's national .ie domain. This means that every application for a .ie domain name is checked to make sure that the applicant has a real connection with Ireland. Applicants can provide just one document to prove identity and connection to Ireland. Information on supporting documentation is outlined here.

The .ie ccTLD has a Registry – Registrar model.  Becoming a .ie Registrar requires that the applicant has over 200 registered .ie domains or is at least the billing contact on over 200 .ie domains, provides a 2,500 Euro bond, passes a credit check and has a demonstrable knowledge of IE Domain Registry domain naming policies and technical procedures.

In 2004, The Commission for Communications Regulation (Comreg) was to take over the regulation and control of Ireland's domain name .ie.The legislation covering this change was signed into law in 2007. In effect, the move has ComReg regulating while IE Domain Registry continues to run the .ie ccTLD.

In March 2006, IE Domain Registry, the company leading the IENUM consortium, won the competition to provide a commercial registry for the supply of ENUM (Electronic Numbering) services in Ireland. The IE Domain Registry's partner in the IENUM consortium is Internet Privatstiftung Austria (IPA), the Austrian organisation which operates the .at domain name and provided the first ENUM commercial registry service in the world.

In 2014, the Policy Advisory Committee (PAC) was set up by the Board of IE Domain Registry. The PAC was set up to provide advice on policy issues concerning Ireland’s Internet top-level domain, .ie. The PAC makes formal recommendations to the Board for approval.

The PAC follow a 10-step framework known as the .ie Policy Development Process (PDP). The PDP is designed to be bottom-up and consensus-driven. This means that anyone can suggest a policy change and if there is agreement amongst stakeholders, the policy change can be implemented. Further information on the PDP can be found here.

The PAC has supported the below policy change requests:-

The Terms of Reference for the Policy Advisory Committee (PAC), including the PAC membership of eligible organisations, can be found here:

·       Terms of Reference

·       Members of the PAC

The PAC has held four public consultations to gather the opinions of the wider Irish internet community and to ensure that these are taken into consideration during the policy development process. The PAC has also held four additional consultations with other stakeholders deemed to be most impacted by policy change requests to ensure their input is considered.

IE Domain Registry has modernised the registration process over the last number of years. Registering a .ie domain is now more automated with .ie registrations typically going live within an hour or less during weekdays. A web interface for .ie Registrars and an API which enables them to integrate .ie registration procedures with their systems are partially responsible for the more efficient registration process.

The rules for registering .ie domain names were changed on 21 March 2018. This change removed the need to explain why an applicant wants a particular name (also called ‘claim to the name’) when registering a .ie domain name. This made the registration process easier and faster.

Previously, an applicant registering a .ie domain had to prove they had a valid claim to the desired domain and a real, tangible connection to the island of Ireland. Those registering a .ie domain still have to prove their connection to Ireland but no longer need to explain their claim to a name.

IE Domain Registry acted as a ‘Registrar of last resort’ for individuals and companies who for whatever reason, chose not to deal directly with a Registrar. On 31 March 2020, the direct registration service was terminated. On this date, all direct customers were transferred to an accredited .ie Registrar, 101 Domain. 101 Domain was selected after a transparent tender and independently managed auction process.

The drivers for this decision included the declining size of the direct portfolio, the fact that it is common practice in the ccTLD sector - registries are selling/exiting (incl. Finland, Sweden & UK), and IE Domain Registry could not grow the direct portfolio, given its self-imposed restrictions on marketing/promotion motivated by the need to avoid even the perception of competition with Registrars.

In the context of requiring Directs to transfer, IE Domain Registry was satisfied that there would be no adverse issues arising or risks regarding consumer choice, efficient markets and intensity of competition:-

·      There are over ~130 accredited .ie Registrars, providing a range of services, with bundled options and at differing price points,

·      There is a mix of national and international Registrars, and many are ICANN accredited

·      Efficient market exits – with strong, ethical, professional Registrars

·      A ‘Registrar of last resort service’ is not needed in Ireland

ComReg Takes Over IEDR Policy Functions
Under the Communication Regulations (Amendment) Bill 2007, the Communications Regulator (ComReg) has taken over most of the policy functions of IEDR. The legislation was passed by the Oireachtas and came into force on 15 May 2007 with the signing of the Communications Regulation (Amendment) Act, 2007 (Commencement) Order, 2007 – (S.I. No. 224 of 2007).

According to the Regulatory Impact Analysis, the legislation puts in place legal instruments for the regulation of the private sector company (IEDR) which is currently administrating .ie ccTLD. This move to protect the .ie ccTLD and provide the mechanisms to transfer the administration of .ie ccTLD away from IEDR if required makes this legislation very powerful and effectively changes IEDR to being a service company from its previous position of making policy and administrating the .ie ccTLD.

The legislation gives ComReg complete power over .ie ccTLD policy decisions: designating the authority to register .ie domains; setting renewal periods and conditions; revoking registrations, registration conditions; pricing of .ie domains and appeals against revocation of registrations. IEDR, however, still provides the day-to-day administration of .ie ccTLD.
 Communication Regulations (Amendment) Bill 2007
 Regulatory Impact Analysis

See also
 Communications in Ireland

External links
IE
 Communication Regulations (Amendment) Bill 2007
 Terms of Reference
 Members of the PAC

Internet governance organizations
Mass media in the Republic of Ireland
Organisations based in the Republic of Ireland
Science and technology in the Republic of Ireland
University College Dublin